The Royal Canadian Air Cadets is a Canadian national youth program for young individuals aged 12 to 18. Under the authority of the National Defence Act, the program is administered by the Canadian Forces (CF) and funded through the Department of National Defence (DND). Additional support is provided by the civilian Air Cadet League of Canada (ACL). Together with the Royal Canadian Sea Cadets and Royal Canadian Army Cadets, it forms the "largest federally funded youth program in the country".  Cadets are not members of the military and are not obliged to join the Canadian Forces.

The first squadrons were established in 1941 to train young men for duties during World War II. Today the focus is on general aviation within the aim: "To instill in youth the attributes of good citizenship and leadership; promote physical fitness; and stimulate an interest in the activities of the Canadian Forces."

The majority of cadet training takes place at the local squadron during the regular school year, with a percentage of cadets selected for summer training courses across Canada. Central to the air cadet program are the gliding and flying courses offered to air cadets who qualify. One in five private pilots in Canada is an ex-air cadet, and 67% of commercial and airline pilots began their careers as an air cadet. There are 454 squadrons located across the country with enrollment of over 26,000 Air Cadets.

Overview 
The aim of the Cadet Program is to develop in youth the attributes of good citizenship and leadership; promote physical fitness; and stimulate the interest of youth in the sea, land, and air activities of the Canadian Forces; however, each focuses on its own parent element. The Air Cadet motto is "To learn. To serve. To advance.", and was created by Robert Myles Colwell in 1966 when he was a cadet with 625 Squadron in Perth-Andover, New Brunswick.

Persons aged 12 to 18 may join the Air Cadet Program. The organization and rank system of the Royal Canadian Air Force is used with the exceptions of flight corporalequivalent to master corporal in the Army Cadet Program or master sea cadet in the Sea Cadet Program; flight sergeant - equivalent to warrant officer in the Army Cadet Program and petty officer 1st class in the Sea Cadet Program; warrant officer 2nd class - equivalent to master warrant officer in the Army Cadet Program and chief petty officer 2nd class in the Sea Cadet Program; and warrant officer 1st class - equivalent to chief warrant officer in the Army Cadet Program and chief petty officer 1st class in the Sea Cadet Program. Cadets are not members of the Canadian Forces, and there is no expectation of a future military career. Adult leadership is provided by members of the Canadian Forces Reserve subcomponent Cadet Organizations Administration and Training Service composed mostly of officers of the Cadet Instructors Cadre (CIC), supplemented, if necessary, by contracted civilian instructors, authorized adult volunteers, and, on occasion, officers and non-commissioned members of other CF branches. The CIC is specifically trained to deliver the Royal Canadian Sea, Army, and Air Cadet training program, and like all reservists come from all walks of life and all parts of the community. Some are former cadets, many have former regular or reserve force service. In keeping with Commonwealth custom, the Royal Canadian Air Cadets stand last in the order of precedence, after the Royal Canadian Sea and Army Cadets.

The Canadian Cadet Organization is sponsored in partnership by the CF/DND and the civilian Air Cadet League, along with the Navy League and Army Cadet League. Each cadet unit is supported by a local squadron sponsoring committee responsible to the national League through each of the provincial committees. The basic Air Cadet program is provided at no cost, including uniforms and activities. Many Air Cadet squadrons are sponsored locally by a service organization or club such as a Royal Canadian Legion Branch, Royal Canadian Air Force Association Wing, Rotary Club, Lions Club, others are supported by a locally established committee often composed of parents of cadets. The local civilian sponsors must raise money to provide for accommodation, utilities, liability insurance, local awards, and additional training resources or special activities, such as mess dinners, band instruments or squadron excursions and trips, not funded by the CF/DND. Cadets and their parents are encouraged to participate in fund-raising activities.

History 
The Air Cadet Organization originated in the early days of World War II when the war effort required young men to meet Canada's military obligations.
By 1938 there existed a couple of groups that would help promote such an effort. In Winnipeg, Manitoba this was the Winnipeg Air Cadets launched by Albert Bennett. Other such groups existed in St. Catharines, ON and in Penhold, AB.

Prior to 1940, official Air Cadet squadrons did not exist.  However, in 1939 Alan Duncan Bell-Irving and A.W. (Nick) Carter formed the 1601 Air Force Cadet Wing in Vancouver. This Squadron was operated directly by the Department of National Defence in association with the 111 Squadron of the RCAF, which was stationed in Vancouver at the time.  A.W. (Nick) Carter became the first commanding officer of the 1601 Wing until he was called to Ottawa to assist in the formation of the new Air Cadet League of Canada.  After the formation of the Air Cadet League of Canada the 1601 Wing was chartered to the League and became 111 Vancouver Squadron.  The 111 Air Cadet Squadron still exists and parades at Bessborough Armoury in Vancouver under the name 111 Pegasus Squadron.

In 1940, Air Minister Power directed that a nationwide voluntary organization be formed to sponsor and develop a select group of young men who would be trained to meet the increasing need for operational pilots in the Royal Canadian Air Force (RCAF) during World War II.

On November 11, 1940, an Order-in-Council was passed to establish the Air Cadet League of Canada to work in partnership with the RCAF. The first squadrons were organized in 1941 and by 1942 there were 135 squadrons and 10,000 cadets, mostly recruited from the Army Cadets.  By 1943, there were 315 squadrons with a membership of 23,000. In 1944, the program reached its peak membership with 29,000 cadets in 374 squadrons.

The first uniform the Air Cadets used were hand me down uniforms from the Pre War era RCAF.  It consisted of a blue/gray wool uniform; cap (wedge), pants and a full collar tunic.  This was phased out in 1943 with an open collar variation similar to the war time RCAF enlisted man's tunic.  After the war the air cadet organization received more hand me down uniforms from the RCAF before adopting the battle dress style uniform.

After the war, membership dropped to a low of 11,000 in 155 squadrons and the Air Cadet program underwent a transformation to reflect the changing needs of Canada and the cadets. The Air Cadet League introduced awards for proficiency and loyalty to the squadrons, summer courses were offered at RCAF stations, and a flying scholarship course was developed. To date, more than 15,000 cadets have received their private pilot licence through the scholarship course. Training shifted to be focused on the development of citizenship and an interest in aviation. Interest was renewed; by 1961, 332 squadrons were in existence and in 1972, authority was given for membership of up to 28,000 cadets.

In 1953, Philip, Duke of Edinburgh, was appointed the organization's Air Commodore-in-Chief, a position he held until his death in 2021.

In areas where there was a high interest in air cadets, additional squadrons were established with different parade nights to accommodate the numbers. These squadrons were often placed into air cadet wings (a formation of two or more squadrons) with a separate wing HQ staff of both officers and senior cadets overseeing the operation. The system was discontinued in the late 1960s and all squadrons became independent once again.

From the early days senior air cadets were given opportunities to work in staff positions beside officers, certain contracted civilians and RCAF/CF members at summer camps across Canada. A system was developed where senior cadets aged 16 or older were temporarily enrolled in the RCAF/CF on short-term contracts and given the rank of Acting Corporal. They were referred to as Call-out Corporals. The Senior Leaders Course at Cold Lake later even used the CF rank of Acting Master Corporal among its staff of Call-out Corporals. Later the system was abolished and the "staff cadet" program selected senior cadets for advanced training who were appointed as staff cadets to assist the adult leadership.

With the unification of the Royal Canadian Navy, the Canadian Army and the Royal Canadian Air Force in 1968, the Canadian Forces became the Air Cadet League's military partner in the delivery of air cadet training. In 1975, legislation was changed to officially allow the enrolment of female cadets into the Royal Canadian Sea, Army, and Air Cadets. The "battle dress" style woolen air force blue uniform was changed to a CF rifle green safari style uniform. The style and weight were more suited to the indoor and summer training reality of the program. The first of these was issued to cadet squadrons commencing in 1978. A new embellished brass cap badge was issued and air cadet wings were worn on the left brest rather than the right. When the CF went back to separate uniform colours in the mid-1980s, cadets followed again with a new air force blue cadet uniform being issued but following the same style as the outgoing green uniform. Squadrons received these new uniforms commencing in the fall of 1992.

Today, the Royal Canadian Air Cadets has a membership of approximately 23,000 in 456 squadrons; and together with the Royal Canadian Sea Cadets and Royal Canadian Army Cadets, forms the "largest federally funded youth program in the country". The membership has also diversified, becoming gender balanced and attracting and retaining visible minorities.

Local training 

Each squadron trains one night per week—a "parade night"—to undertake the local training program. The course of instruction is prescribed by the Director of Cadets and outlined in course training plans distributed to each squadron. The six-year program provides cadets instruction in citizenship, leadership, survival training, instructional techniques, drill and ceremonial and the basics of aviation and aeronautics. In the fifth and subsequent years, cadets may be assigned to instruct these classes to the younger cadets. The local training begins in September and continues until June.

In addition to the mandatory weekly training syllabus, there are additional regularly scheduled activities that cadets can participate in optional training that includes band, firearms safety and marksmanship using the 10 metre air rifle for both training and competition, biathlon, military drill practice, first aid training and competitions, and ground school instruction in preparation for glider pilot and private pilot training courses. Many of these activities also involve regional, provincial, or national competitions between teams and individual cadets.

Throughout the year there are weekend exercises organized by the local squadrons. Survival exercises, participation in Remembrance Day ceremonies, and familiarization flights are all common activities. Cadet squadrons participate in community events such as parades and band concerts.

Cadet Program Update – Squadron program 
Beginning with the 2008/2009 training year, a new training system was introduced replacing the program that was in use since 1992. The Cadet Program Update (CPU) brings new teaching materials and incorporates more contemporary educational and youth development methods. Similar updates to the Sea and Army Cadet programs rationalize the connectivity between the three programs and more efficiently provides the training that is common to all three elements.

The cornerstone of the CPU is the recognition that people between the ages of 12-18 pass through three basic "Developmental Periods" (DPs).  These DPs mark the development of their cognitive abilities from a purely experienced-based (i.e. "hands-on") method of learning to abstract problem-solving and competency.  The training methods used at each training level reflect the target age group of the cadets in that training level.

The delivery of the various performance objectives (POs) will be through a mixture of mandatory and complementary enabling objectives (EOs).  The mandatory EOs will be the same for all air cadet squadrons.  Individual squadrons may choose from a number of complementary EOs to support the mandatory training.  The selection of complementary training activities at a local squadron is based on the local resources and the interests of the cadets involved.

The program will be phased in one year at a time with the new proficiency level 5 being introduced for the 2012/2013 training year.  Cadets already undergoing training in the current system will complete their training under the outgoing system.

Squadron training levels 
Air Cadets are challenged to qualify to five training levels. Each level is normally completed in the ten-month training period from September to June. With the approval of the commanding officer, cadets 14 years of age and older may complete levels 1 and 2 in a single training year. Success in meeting the required standard is rewarded with the appropriate level qualification badge. In Level Four cadets learn to instruct so that when they reach Level Five, they are ready to teach other cadets.  The chart below displays the training level structure of the Royal Canadian Air Cadets. As of 2022, PHASE (Promoting Healthy And Safe Experiences) training has replaced PSRY (Positive Social Relations with Youth) training.

Complimentary training groups 
Squadrons, depending on a number of factors, may have some of the following teams/groups to compliment mandatory training. This is not an exhaustive list.

 Drill team: The vast majority of squadrons have some sort of drill team. On drill team, cadets will refine their drill learned during mandatory parade nights and learn more complex drill maneuvers. Cadets on drill team may have the opportunity to join a drill team at arms, join a flag party, or compete in regional competitions. Cadets interested in drill may elect to take the Drill and Ceremonial Instructor summer training course.
 Marksmanship team: Some squadrons may have a marksmanship team. Cadets on marksmanship team learn to fire lead pellets at paper targets using the Daisy Air Rifle, which is not legally classified as a firearm. Cadets may compete in regional or national marksmanship competitions. Cadets interested in marksmanship may elect to take the Air Rifle Marksmanship Instructor summer training course.
 Military band: Some squadrons may elect to offer musical training. Cadets in military band have the opportunity to learn a brass, woodwind, or percussion instrument. Cadets will learn their instrument as well as various specialized drill maneuvers. Military bands in cadets are led by adult staff and a cadet Drum Major. Cadets may have the opportunity to compete in musical competitions at various levels. Cadets interested in music may elect to take the Military Band Musician summer training course.
 Pipe band: Some squadrons may offer pipes and drums training. Cadets in a pipe band have the opportunity to learn the bagpipes, snare drum, tenor drum, or bass drum. Cadets will learn their instrument as well as various specialized drill maneuvers. Pipe bands in the cadets are led by adult staff, a cadet Pipe Major, and a cadet Drum Major.  Pipe Band Musician was not offered as summer training course in 2022.
 Biathlon team: Some squadrons may have a biathlon team. Cadets will learn how to run or ski cross-country and learn how to shoot a target. Cadets may have the opportunity to compete in regional or national competitions.
 Ground school: Some squadrons may have a ground school group, where cadets learn the fundamentals of aviation (per Transport Canada guidelines). Less squadrons have offered this in recent years due to the introduction of the national online ground school, which is the only recognized ground school program for applications for the cadet PPTC and GPTC.

Summer training 

Air cadets have the opportunity to participate in training outside of their squadron during the summer. Cadets can participate in either Cadet Activity Programs, summer training courses at a Cadet Training Centre (CTC), or national summer training courses such as PPTC and GPTC.

Cadet Activity Program (CAP) 
The Cadet Activity Program (CAP) was created in 2022 to replace the 1-week General Training course and most basic-level summer training courses. Unlike the GT course, CAPs do not take place at CTCs, instead taking place in the cadet's community. Cadets in their first year of cadets can participate in a 5-day CAP, during which they will participate in a variety of cadet-oriented activities. Cadets in their second year of cadets can participate in a 12-day CAP, where there is more of a focus on team-building and leadership skills. CAPs are run by the Cadet Instructor Cadre, with instruction usually given by Staff Cadets.

Summer training courses 
Summer training courses are what is considered "traditional" summer training. Summer training courses take place at Cadet Training Centres (CTCs) and last from 2 to 7 weeks. All courses contain a 1-week online training component and at least 1 week of in-person, overnight training. These courses allow cadets to pick a specialty within the cadet program in areas such as drill, music, survival, aviation, fitness, and marksmanship. Instruction is delivered by officers of the Cadet Instructor Cadre (CIC), civilian adult staff, and Staff Cadets. Upon successful completion of a course, cadets are issued a badge to be worn on their tunic.

National courses 
There are three national courses in the air cadet summer training program as of 2022. The Oshkosh Trip, Advanced Aerospace, and Aviation Technology and Aerospace courses were not options for air cadets in 2022.

International Air Cadet Exchange (IACE) 
The International Air Cadet Exchange is a three-week exchange that allow cadets to visit air bases, industry centres, world landmarks, universities, cultural centres and museums, and experience private hospitality with families in their homes. It is intended for outstanding senior cadets who will represent Canada with distinction. Outside of Canada, destinations include Australia, Belgium, China, France, Germany, Hong Kong, Japan, Netherlands, New Zealand, South Korea, Turkey, the United Kingdom, and the United States.

Glider Pilot Training Course 
The Glider Pilot Training Course (GPTC) is a seven-week course with an intensive program of ground school and in-flight glider pilot training. For a cadet to be eligible, cadets must write the national online ground school exam, and once passed (minimum 60%), Candidates will be interviewed through the Merit Review Board (MRB) process. Candidates must be 16, but not yet 19 years of age by September 1 of the summer training year. Once selected, cadets who successfully complete their flight test and Transport Canada written exam will qualify for a glider pilot licence and be awarded Air Cadet Glider Pilot Wings. The air cadet program is responsible for producing the largest number of glider pilots within Canada. On average, the program produces 320 glider pilots annually. Upon attaining their licences, these pilots join their local headquarters to provide other cadets with glider familiarization flying during the spring and fall seasons.

Power Pilot Training Course 
The Power Pilot Training Course (PPTC) is a seven-week course that allows cadets to get their private pilot licence and their Air Cadet Power Pilot Wings. A goal for many cadets within the program is to secure a private pilot licence prior to the age of 19. Cadets who are aged 17–18 apply and are selected to write an exam and interview for the course. The course provides cadets with both ground school training and in-flight instruction at the various flight centres across Canada. Cadets who have been successful within the program have integrated themselves with commercial airlines, the Canadian Forces, various courier and charter companies, and have also gone on to become instructors at various flight schools. Overall, this opportunity to attain a private pilots’ licence remains as one of the most prestigious and attractive opportunities available within the Air Cadet program.

After successfully completing a summer course, cadets are presented with a qualification badge to display on their uniform. The badges may be seen on the Cadets.ca website.

Cadet Training Centres (CTCs) 
The cadet training centres (CTC) of the Royal Canadian Air Cadets are distributed across Canada, often co-located with a Canadian Forces base. Here are the following CTCs used for air cadets as of 2022:

Summer training courses (2022) 
As of the transition to the new program in the 2021/2022 training year, the summer training courses varies from year to year. All courses, with the exceptions of the Glider Pilot Training Course and the Private Pilot Training Course, include 1 week of virtual learning and 3 weeks of in-person training, totaling 4 weeks of training. Levels 1 and 2 will no longer participate in training at Cadet Training Centres, but will participate in locally-developed Cadet Activity Programs.

*The Pipe Band Musician course was not run in 2022. Options are being explored to offer the course outside of a CTC environment.

Flying 

Throughout the spring and fall approximately 22,000 air cadets participate in familiarization gliding at regional gliding centres located across the country.

Each summer, 320 cadets earn a Transport Canada Glider Pilot Licence through the Air Cadet Glider Pilot Training Course and 250 more earn a Private Pilot licence.

The Air Cadet Gliding Program conducts approximately 60,000 glider flights annually in Schweizer SGS 2-33 gliders.

The aircraft fleet used in the gliding program is owned by the Air Cadet League of Canada. The fleet, consisting of more than 100 gliders and tow planes  is maintained by the Canadian Forces under a memorandum of understanding. Canadian Forces pilots and Civilian Instructors operate the fleet to train cadets. The aircraft that are used during the Private Pilot Training Course are various, and they depend on the flight school the cadet is posted at during their course. The Private Pilot Training Course is operated by private flight schools, and the instructors are not affiliated with the cadet program. The aircraft can be a Cessna 152, Cessna 150, Cessna 172, or DA20 Katana.

Aircraft

Uniform 
Uniforms are provided at no charge. Cadets are responsible for care, cleaning and custody of the issued kit and also to return it when ceasing to be a cadet. The uniform includes: wedge, wide-brimmed tan summer hat, toque, rank slip-ons, short-sleeved shirt, necktie, T-shirt, turtleneck sweater, jacket (tunic), jacket belt, trousers, trousers belt, all-season jacket, boots, grey wool socks, running shoes, grey sports shorts, and blue sports T-shirt.

Cadets in uniform shall be well groomed with footwear cleaned and shone. Their uniform shall be clean and properly pressed at all times. In particular, buttons, fasteners and zippers shall be kept closed. Hair must be of natural colour.

For male cadets, hair should not touch the ears or have excessive length or bulk on the head. At the top of the back of the neck, hair will either be evenly tapered or be clean cut. Moustaches are authorized but must conform to dress regulations.  Some hairstyles and a beard are authorized for religious or medical reasons and, when authorized, must conform to dress standards.  Otherwise, male cadets must be clean shaven.

For females, short hair must be neat and may not extend past the bottom of the collar, while long hair must be pulled back into a tight bun, and may be contained by a hairnet. Very long hair may be braided or worn as a bun. Hair elastics, bobby pins and hairnets should be the same colour as the cadet's hair. When braided the cadets hair may be worn in either double or single French braids and in both cases the braids must fall behind the shoulders and not extend past the bottom of the armpit.

Different numbered orders of dress are worn on different occasions. Here are the numbered orders of dress:
C-1 (Ceremonial): Worn during formal ceremonies or parades; when parading as part of a guard of Honour; for church services and parades; for funerals; or, other occasions as ordered. Medals are worn with this order of dress.
C-2, C-3, and C-4 (Routine Training): C-2 dress is worn for day to day training; routine parades; or other occasions as ordered. It must be worn while travelling to and from a CTC. The dress is the same as C-1, except that the medal ribbons replaces the medals. C-3 and C-4 is the same as C-2, except that the turtleneck and blue T-shirt replaces the shirt and tie respectively; C-3 may be worn in cold weather.
C-5 (Field Training Uniform): This order of dress is slowly replacing C-2, C-3, and C-4 as the day-to-day uniform. No medals, medal ribbons, pilot wings, or pins are worn with this order of dress.
C-6 (Sports): Worn as directed by the squadron or CTC CO. CTC staff cadets wearing this order of dress while on duty shall wear their rank brassard.
C-7 (CTC Staff Cadet): Worn by CTC staff cadets. Rank slip-ons and name tag shall be worn. The wear of medal ribbons and the Certificate of Commendation Pin is authorized on the dress. Metal wings may be worn.
C-8 (Mess dress) Worn during mess or formal dinners, and other occasions as ordered. Same as C-2, except that the white collar dress shirt with black bow tie replaces the shirt and tie.

Ranks 

Upon enrollment, a new cadet in the Air Cadet Program is known as a "Cadet" (Cdt). Appointment (or promotion) to higher ranks occurs after the cadet has met certain nationally prescribed standards.  The specific criteria for all ranks are established to ensure that all cadets who receive a rank promotion possess the same basic qualifications or similar experience, the successful completion of squadron training serves as the common standard on which all cadets are evaluated, and that every cadet is given the same opportunity to advance.

Because there is a maximum number of established positions for ranks warrant officer first class (one per squadron), promotions are based on the results of a merit review board. The composition of the merit review board includes a minimum of three to a maximum of five members. As appointed by the squadron commanding officer, members include: Commanding officer (or delegate) acting as board chairperson; Air Cadet League or local sponsor representative; and a minimum of one and maximum of three additional members from the following: representative(s) of the RCSU CO (area Cadet Instructor Cadre officer, regional cadet advisor, area cadet officer, etc.), squadron CIC officer(s) (from within own or members of neighbouring squadrons), and member(s) of the community (to include: school principal, Legion member, etc.). Prior to 1976, the size of the squadron dictated the top rank available and many squadrons were ineligible to carry a WO1 on their establishment effectively capping promotion at WO2 for the squadron's ranking cadet.

Responsibilities are given to cadets upon reaching Flight Corporal (FCpl), the first NCO rank.  In September 2007, the rank of "flight corporal" (FCpl) was introduced. The badge is similar to the insignia of a flight sergeant incorporating a crown above two chevrons. The new rank brought the rank progression for the sea, army, and air cadet programs into line. Flight corporals and corporals generally assist a more senior cadet, such as a flight sergeant who leads a flight (a small, organizational group of air cadets). Sergeants are responsible for most of the day-to-day activities of the squadron and assist the flight sergeants as second in command of a flight. Warrant officers work closely with the officer staff of the squadron, assisting with administration, logistical, leadership, and training. In smaller squadrons, these roles may be filled by more junior cadets.

The official phrasing for the ranks uses the word cadet as a preface — as an example, cadet corporal. However, custom omits cadet in casual reference. Thus, corporal is the usual wording. Generally, where there is a need to distinguish between cadets and Canadian Forces members, ranks will be written or spoken as cadet corporal and abbreviated as C/Cpl.

While it is customary within the organization to refer to a cadet receiving a rank as being "promoted," the official documentation (Queens Rules and Regulations (Cadets) and CATO) vary: the senior document describing progression as an "appointment", the other describing progression as "promotion".

The chart displays the rank structure of the Royal Canadian Air Cadets.

Music appointments 

When a squadron wishes to create a cadet band, the decision to do so must be made in consultation with the sponsoring committee responsible for provision and maintenance of musical instruments. The cadet music program recognizes two types of bands: military bands and pipe bands. Military bands' instrumentation includes woodwinds, brass, and/or percussion, while pipe bands' instrumentation includes pipes and drums. The Regional Support Cadet Unit should provide instruments on loan to their squadrons to maximize the use of the instruments held by the region and CSTCs and to better support squadron training. The music proficiency levels are recognized on the cadet uniform using a system of badges based on the music training programs; the military band badge represents a lyre, while the pipe band badge represents either a pipe or a drum, depending on the instrument played.

The appointment of a Drum Major or Pipe Major is at the discretion of the corps/squadron CO. Requirements considered include: demonstration of skills and knowledge in band drill, commands and formations, qualification of Music Proficiency Level 2, and holds the minimum rank of Flight Corporal. Only one cadet may be appointed as the squadron Drum Major or Pipe Major at any time.

Honours and awards 
The Canadian Cadet Movement maintains its own Honours and Awards system.  Cadets may be awarded these based on criteria including bravery, citizenship, service, outstanding performance on a summer training course, and more.  In addition, cadets may also wear, on their uniform, any orders, decorations, and medals of Canada they have been awarded.

Within the system, there are several honours and awards common to all three cadet elements and some that are unique to each.  A cadet who transfers from one element to another may continue to wear any medals awarded from their previous service, but in general, air cadets may be eligible for the following nine honours and awards, and are in the order of precedence:

Symbols

Flags 

In some squadrons, the ensign and squadron banner are carried by a flag party with the Flag of Canada (see image in the Local training section above), despite CF custom being for one- or two-flag parties only.  Subject to regional regulations, flag party escorts may carry deactivated drill purpose rifles.

The Royal Canadian Air Cadets Banner is flown only on important ceremonial occasions to indicate the presence of a formed body of cadets, and, at the end of useful life, is deposited, after the manner of colours, in some suitable location. The banner was presented in 1991 at the Senior Leaders Course at CFB Cold Lake, and was paraded at the Senior Leaders Course graduation parades each summer until the course was replaced with the Leadership and Ceremonial Instructor Course.  Though not consecrated, the flag parallels Air Force Command Colours and is carried in the same manner. Cadets pay compliments to the banner in a similar manner to a consecrated colour. Members of the CF are not required to pay compliments to the banner but may do so as a courtesy.

Originally approved in 1941, the Royal Canadian Air Cadets Ensign was modified in 1971 to incorporate the National Flag in the canton.  The flag parallels a Canadian Forces command flag (as distinct from a Command Colour).  The ensign is normally flown at the squadron and often carried as part of a flag party. It is always flown from a mast or pole at air cadet summer training centres.

The squadron banner parallels an Air Force Squadron Standard and is carried by squadrons as their specific unit identifier.  Unlike a squadron standard, however, an air cadet squadron banner may not be consecrated nor can they emblazoned with battle honours. Though squadron banners may not be consecrated they may,  be dedicated and may be laid up in a manner paralleling similar ceremonies for squadron standards. Compliments are paid to the squadron banner in the same manner as the Air Cadet Banner.
The squadron's name and number are embroidered on the banner.  The Air Cadet League did for a brief period allow the acquisition of squadron banners featuring the individual squadron's badge in place of standard design.  It is unclear, should any of these banners require replacement, if anything other than the standard design will be authorized.

Badge 

The badge of the Royal Canadian Air Cadets consists of a circlet surrounded by a wreath of maple leaves, superimposed with a flying falcon, the head to the sinister (left). The whole is crowned by the Royal crown — fashioned as a St Edward's Crown — to symbolise the monarchy of Canada as the Cadets' source of authority. This all rests on a scroll displaying the words "Royal Canadian Air Cadets/Cadets de l'aviation royale du Canada".

It is worn as a brass or embroidered badge on the left side of the wedge cap and other formal headdress, and as an embroidered patch on the all-weather jacket. The original hat badge featured an eagle surmounted by a single maple leaf, with two underlying scrolls reading "Air Cadets Canada".

Cadet Fitness Assessment and Incentive Program 

The Cadet Fitness Assessment and Incentive Program replaced the old fitness testing program in the 2010-2011 training year. It is based on the FITNESSGRAM testing protocol produced by the Cooper Institute.

Fitness assessment

Incentive program 
There are four incentive levels cadets can achieve upon doing the fitness assessment: bronze, silver, gold, and excellence. Scoring of the cadet depends on the age and gender of the cadet. Each test in the fitness assessment is scored as follows:

Using incentive level standards, each of the 5 or 6 tests is awarded an achievement level. The minimum achievement level reached of all 5 components is awarded; only the highest two of the three flexibility tests is used in determining the achievement levels for the Flexibility component.

There are four badges that can be awarded by a squadron for the fitness exam. Bronze, Silver, Gold, and Excellence.

Notable former air cadets

See also 
 History of the Cadet Instructors Cadre
 Canadian Forces
 Air Training Corps (UK)
 Australian Air Force Cadets
 New Zealand Air Training Corps
 Civil Air Patrol

References

External links 

 Canadian Cadet Organizations
 Air Cadet League of Canada

Air Cadet organisations
Aviation history of Canada
Canadian Cadet organizations
Youth organizations based in Canada
Organizations based in Canada with royal patronage